The dorsal artery of the penis is an artery on the top surface of the penis. It is a branch of the internal pudendal artery. It runs forward on the dorsum of the penis to the glans, where it divides into two branches to the glans penis and the foreskin (prepuce). 

The dorsal artery of the penis supplies the integument and fibrous sheath of the corpus cavernosum penis, the glans penis, the foreskin, and the skin of the distal shaft. It also branches with circumflex arteries that supply the corpus spongiosum. Its role in erectile function is unknown. 

The dorsal artery of the penis may be damaged in traumatic amputation of the penis and repairing the dorsal artery surgically prevents skin loss, but it is not essential for sexual and urinary function. Its hemodynamics and blood pressure can be assessed to test for sexual impairment.

Structure 
The dorsal artery of the penis is a branch of the internal pudendal artery. It ascends between the crus penis and the pubic symphysis of the pelvis. As it pierces the perineal membrane, it passes between the two layers of the suspensory ligament of the penis. It runs forward on the dorsum of the penis to the glans. At the glans, it divides into two branches to the glans penis and the foreskin (prepuce). On the penis, it lies between the dorsal nerve and deep dorsal vein. 

The dorsal artery give perforators to the corpus cavernosum penis. It sends branches through the fibrous sheath of the corpus cavernosum penis to anastomose with the deep artery of the penis. It anastomoses with the artery of bulb of penis.

Function 
The dorsal artery of the penis supplies the fibrous sheath of the corpus cavernosum penis. It gives branches to the glans penis, and the foreskin (prepuce). Through retrograde flow they help supply the skin of the distal shaft. It also gives branches to the circumflex arteries that supply the corpus spongiosum.

The dorsal artery of the penis gives perforators to the corpus cavernosum penis. Despite this, their contribution to erectile function is inconsistent.

Clinical significance

Trauma 
The dorsal artery of the penis may be damaged during traumatic amputation of the penis. Failure to perform re-anastomosis of the dorsal artery (with surgery) leads to skin loss.

Sexual impairment 
Sexual impairment in men may be assessed with a small blood pressure cuff to assess hemodynamics and blood pressure.

Additional images

References

External links 
  - "Cross-section of the penis."
 
 
 
 

Arteries of the abdomen
Human penis anatomy